The 2019 Lichfield District Council election took place on 2 May to elect members of Lichfield District Council in Staffordshire, England. The whole council - 47 members - was up for election and the Conservative Party retained overall control of the council.

Campaign
Labour, Conservative, Liberal Democrats, Independent, UKIP and Green Party candidates stood in the election. Between one and three members of the council were elected from each ward, depending on the electorate's size.

Summary

Election result

The Conservatives maintained control of the council.

|-

Results by ward
Elected candidates in bold.

By-elections

Summerfield and All Saints by-election, 6 May 2021

Bernard Brown resigned from the council in July 2020, as council meetings were being held exclusively online due to the COVID-19 pandemic, and he was unable to attend as he did not have access to the Internet.

Armitage & Handsacre

References

2019 English local elections
Lichfield District Council elections
2010s in Staffordshire
May 2019 events in the United Kingdom